The Australian Father of the Year Award is presented annually to "a distinguished father who has demonstrated support, guidance and love to his children or other children through his working role or family life."

Awards 
The award was inaugurated in 1957 by The Australian Father's Day Council. 
The Shepherd Centre (TSC) has been involved from 1998-2021, in 2022 the award organisation was handed to The Fathering Project. 
Much like TSC, The Fathering Project together with the Australian Father's Day Council launch an annual campaign to find Australia's best high-profile father. The  winner is announced at a luncheon, with all proceeds going to TSC; a charity that teaches deaf and hearing-impaired children to listen and speak using an early intervention program.

The award is not associated with the Australian government run Australian of the Year awards.

Past recipients

See also
Australian Mother of the Year Award

References

External links
Australian Father of the Year

Awards established in 1957
Fatherhood
Father of the Year|Father Of The Year
1957 establishments in Australia